Lord of Casa Rubianes is a hereditary title in the Peerage of Spain accompanied by the dignity of Grandee, granted in 1761 by Charles III to Rodrigo Antonio de Mendoza y Caamaño, descendant of the original Lords of Rubianes.

Lords of Casa Rubianes (1761)

Rodrigo Antonio de Mendoza y Caamaño, 1st Lord of Casa Rubianes
Joaquín Ginés de Oca y Moctezuma, 2nd Lord of Casa Rubianes
Clara de Oca y Moctezuma, 3rd Lady of Casa Rubianes
Juan Gayoso de Mendoza y Caamaño, 4th Lord of Casa Rubianes
Miguel Gayoso de Mendoza y Caamaño, 5th Lord of Casa Rubianes
José Ramón Ozores y Calo, 6th Lord of Casa Rubianes
Juan Ozores y Valderrama, 7th Lord of Casa Rubianes
Jacobo Ozores y Mosquera, 8th Lord of Casa Rubianes
Gonzalo Ozores y Saavedra, 9th Lord of Casa Rubianes
Alfonso Ozores y Saavedra, 10th Lord of Casa Rubianes
Gonzalo Ozores y Úrcola, 11th Lord of Casa Rubianes
Beatriz Ozores y Rey, 12th Lady of Casa Rubianes

See also
List of lords in the peerage of Spain
List of current Grandees of Spain

References

Lords of Spain
Lists of Spanish nobility